Sod is grass and the part of the soil beneath it held together by the roots.

Sod or SOD may also refer to:

Language
 English colloquial word "sod" originally derived from Sodomite
 Arabic letter ṣād ص

Science
 Superoxide dismutase (SOD), a group of antioxidant enzymes
 Small Outline Diode (SOD), an integrated circuit packaging type
 Septo-optic dysplasia (SOD), a congenital malformation syndrome of the optic nerve
 Sphincter of Oddi dysfunction (SOD), a digestive condition pertaining to the sphincter muscle of Oddi
 Sudden oak death (SOD), caused by Phytophthora ramorum

Entertainment
 Soft On Demand (SOD), a Japanese porn company
 Spear of Destiny (SOD), episode of video game Wolfenstein 3D
SOD, a video game art mod by Jodi (art collective)
 Stormtroopers of Death (S.O.D.), a New York crossover thrash band
 S.O.D. - The Epic Years, a 1987 compilation album by Spear of Destiny (band)
 S.O.D. (mixtape), by Tony Yayo (2008)

Other abbreviations
 Separation of duties (SoD), or segregation of duties, for fraud and error prevention
 Shannon-One-Design (SOD), a class of sailing dinghy
 Special Operations Division (SOD) of the U.S. Drug Enforcement Administration
 Systems-oriented design (S.O.D.)

Other uses
 Sod Ryan (1905–1964), American football player
 Sod, West Virginia, an unincorporated community in northeastern Lincoln County, West Virginia, United States
 Sod, a type of Pardes (Jewish exegesis)

See also 
 Sods (disambiguation)
 Sod's law, UK: if something can go wrong, it will
 How to Be a Little Sod, book by Simon Brett